Damhnait Doyle (born December 9, 1975) is a Canadian musician, singer and composer. A phonetic spelling of her first name (which is Irish) also serves as the title of her 2003 album. She was a member of Atlantic Canadian band Shaye from 2003–2009 with Kim Stockwood and Tara MacLean (2003–2007). Along with Blake Manning, Stuart Cameron and Peter Fusco, she formed a new band called The Heartbroken which was active since 2009.

Career
Doyle took singing, guitar and clarinet lessons as a child, and released her debut album, Shadows Wake Me, in 1996. The lead single was "A List of Things", and the album garnered a Juno Award nomination and several East Coast Music Award nominations for Doyle. She toured Canada with Steve Earle in support of his album I Feel Alright.

In 2000, Doyle released her follow-up album, Hyperdramatic which included the single "Tattooed", "Never Too Late", directed by Rob Heydon was nominated for Video of the Year at the East Coast Music Awards. In 2001, Doyle won four ECMA's, including Video of the Year and Female Artist of the Year.

In 2003, Doyle's third album, Davnet, was released. The CD was produced and co-written by Gordie Sampson at Lakewind Sound Studios, his Cape Breton recording studio. The first single was "Another California Song", written by Doyle and Sampson. The video featured Doyle's Shaye bandmates Kim Stockwood and Tara MacLean. A video was also released for "Traffic".

In Christmas of that year, she went to Kabul, Afghanistan, to sing for the Canadian troops there, on the Christmas special Rick Mercer's Christmas in Kabul.

She has worked with Alexz Johnson, co-writing two songs on Songs from Instant Star, then four on Songs from Instant Star Two. She recorded two songs on Songs from Instant Star 3: "Just the Beginning" as well as "Darkness Round The Sun" and two songs on Songs from Instant Star 4: "The Music" and "I Still Love You". The song "Say What You Will" was featured in the Degrassi: The Next Generation episode "The Bitterest Pill", where the school held a memorial for a J.T. Yorke, who was fatally stabbed in the prior episode.

She did a duet with Rex Goudie on his album Look Closer, on the song "Like I Was Dying", which she also co-wrote.

In 2008, Doyle lent her voice to the title sequence of Degrassi: TNG, but her version of the theme was only used for the eighth season.

In 2009, Doyle, along with Blake Manning, Stuart Cameron and Peter Fusco, formed a new band called The Heartbroken. They released their debut album Tonight Tonight in June 2010. In September 2016, they released their follow up recording, Storm Clouds.

Doyle wrote a song for a play her father Clar Doyle wrote for EDFNL, titled the same as the play: "Are You Watching Me Now?".

In April 2019, Doyle released her solo album, Liquor Store Flowers.

In June 2020, she co-hosted the Juno Awards of 2020 alongside Odario Williams. She is host of Weekend Mornings and The Intro on the CBC Music radio network. 

In April 2021, Doyle sang the song "Sleeping in the Cold Below" on the game Warframe.

Discography
Liquor Store Flowers (LP) (2019)
Lights Down Low (LP) (2008)
Davnet (LP) (2003)
Hyperdramatic (LP) (2000)
Hyperdramatic Sampler (EP) (1999)
Shadows Wake Me (LP) (1996)

Singles
"Till I Gain Control Again" (2020) With Stuart Cameron
"A List of Things" (1996) [#10 CAN]
"Whatever You Need" (1996) [#34 CAN]

With Shaye
"God" (Single) (2020)
"You're Not Alone" (Single) (2007)
Lake of Fire (LP) (2007)
"Lake of Fire" (Single) (2006)
"Beauty" (Single) (2004)
"Happy Baby" (Single) (2003)
The Bridge (LP) (2003)

With The Heartbroken
Storm Clouds (LP) (2016)
Tonight Tonight (LP) (2010)

Awards and achievements

2020
ECMA Award Nomination - Contemporary Roots Record [Liquor Store Flowers]
ECMA Award Nomination - Solo Recording of the Year [Liquor Store Flowers]
2015
CMAO Roots Artist/Group of the Year (The Heartbroken)
2014
CCMA Group of the Year Nominee (The Heartbroken)
CMAO Roots Artist/Group of the Year (The Heartbroken)
2013
CCMA Award Winner – Roots Artist/Group of the Year [The Heartbroken]
CMAO Group or Duo of the Year (The Heartbroken)
2011
CCMA Award Nomination – Group or Duo of the Year [The Heartbroken]
2009
ECMA Nomination – Recording of the Year [Lights Down Low]
ECMA Nomination – Pop Recording of the Year
2008
Music NL Award Nomination – Female Artist of the Year
ECMA Nomination - Pop Recording of the Year [Lake of Fire]
ECMA Nomination - Single of the Year [“Lake of Fire”]
2005
SOCAN Pop Music Award Winner [“Happy Baby”]
ECMA Award Winner – Single of the Year [“Happy Baby”]
ECMA Award Nomination – Album of the Year [The Bridge]
ECMA Award Nomination – Group of the Year [Shaye]
ECMA Award Nomination – Pop Recording of the Year [The Bridge]
ECMA Award Nomination – Songwriter of the Year [“Happy Baby”]
ECMA Award Nomination – Single of the Year [“Happy Baby”]
2004
JUNO Award Nomination – Single of the Year [“Happy Baby”]
Canadian Radio Music Award Winner – Best New Group Mainstream AC/Hot AC [“Happy Baby”]
ECMA Award Winner – Female Artist of the Year [davnet]
ECMA Award Winner – Pop/Rock Recording of the Year [davnet]
ECMA Award Nomination – Single of the Year [“Another California Song”]
ECMA Award Nomination – Songwriter of the Year [“Another California Song”]
ECMA Nomination – Video of the Year [“Happy Baby”]
Music NL Nomination – Group of the Year [Shaye]
Music NL Nomination – Pop/Rock Artist/Group of the Year [Shaye]
2003
International Songwriting Competition – “Afterglow”
2001
ECMA Award Winner – Female Artist of the Year [Hyperdramatic]
ECMA Award Winner – Video of the Year [“Tattooed”]
ECMA Award Nomination – Album of the Year [Hyperdramtic]
ECMA Award Nomination – Pop Rock Recording of the Year [Hyperdramtic]
ECMA Award Nomination – Single of the Year [“Tattooed”]
ECMA Award Nomination – Songwriter of the Year [“Tattooed”]
ECMA Award Nomination – Video of the Year [“Never Too Late”]
1997
JUNO Award Nomination – Best New Solo Artist
ECMA Award Nomination – Album of the Year [Shadows Wake Me]
ECMA Award Nomination – Entertainer of the Year
ECMA Award Nomination – Female Artist of the Year
ECMA Award Nomination – Single of the Year [“A List of Things”]
ECMA Award Nomination – Video of the Year [“A List of Things”]

Industry boards
2018–Present
SOCAN, Director 
Canadian Songwriters Hall of Fame, Director
Songwriters Association of Canada, Director

Music placements in film and television
"24 Hours" Alexz Johnson Songs from Instant Star (Orange, Sony BMG)
"Time to Be Your 21" Alexz Johnson Songs from Instant Star (Orange)
"Criminal" Alexz Johnson Songs from Instant Star (Orange)
"Not Standing Alone" Alexz Johnson Instant Star Two (Orange)
"How I Feel" Alexz Johnson Instant Star Two (Orange)
"Anyone But You" Alexz Johnson Instant Star Two (Orange)
"Liar Liar" Alexz Johnson Instant Star Two (Orange)
"Liar Liar" Alexz Johnson Laguna Beach Placement (MTV) 
"Let's Start from Here" Joanna Wang Hold Onto A Dream (Avex/Sony BMG)
"I Owe it All to You" Eva Avila Somewhere Else (Sony BMG) 
"Live Like I Was Dying" Rex Goudie Look Closer (Sony BMG)
"Clothes On My Back" Kyle Riabko TBA (Columbia/Aware)
"Happy Baby" Shaye The Bridge (EMI) 
"Happy Baby" Shaye Women & Songs 9 (Warner)
"Happy Baby" Shaye Red White & Pop (Sony)
"Happy Baby" Shaye Juno Awards 2004 (Universal)

References

Bibliography
Miscellaneous Female: The Journals of Damhnait Doyle (2005)

External links
Official website

1975 births
Living people
Canadian women singer-songwriters
Canadian pop guitarists
Canadian women guitarists
Musicians from Newfoundland and Labrador
Canadian people of Irish descent
People from Labrador City
Canadian women pop singers
20th-century Canadian women singers
21st-century Canadian women singers
21st-century Canadian guitarists
CBC Radio hosts
Canadian women radio hosts
21st-century women guitarists